This is a list of recordings by Will Oldham (a.k.a. Bonnie 'Prince' Billy, Palace Music, etc.).

Main discography 
The nature of Oldham's work, with constant changes in backing musicians and even the names under which he records, can make for a confusing discography.  Below are his releases in as simplified a form as possible.

Albums 
A few of these albums are credited to another artist alongside Will Oldham but with Oldham providing vocals throughout each of the tracks they clearly belong on a list of Oldham albums.

Studio albums

As Bonnie 'Prince' Billy

Live albums 

Get the Fuck on Jolly Live – Bonny Billy and Marquis de Tren featuring the Monkey Boys (2001) limited edition tour CD
Summer in the Southeast – Bonnie 'Prince' Billy (November 15, 2005)
Wilding in the West – Bonnie 'Prince' Billy (January 21, 2008)
Is It The Sea? – Bonnie 'Prince' Billy with Harem Scarem & Alex Neilson (October 20, 2008) UK #172
Funtown Comedown – Bonny Billy & The Picket Line (December 15, 2009)
 The Bonnie Bells of Oxford – Trembling Bells & Bonnie 'Prince' Billy (February 21, 2013)
Pond Scum – Bonnie "Prince" Billy (January 22, 2016) BBC sessions

Compilation albums 

Lost Blues and Other Songs – Palace Music (March 31, 1997)
Guarapero/Lost Blues 2 – Will Oldham (February 21, 2000)
Little Lost Blues – Bonny Billy (September 19, 2006)

EPs 
This section again contains several releases which are credited to Oldham alongside another artist or which are credited to a group other than Palace/Palace Brothers/Palace Music/Palace Songs. In these cases Oldham's contribution is such that they merit mention in his own discography rather than in the collaborations section.
Goat Songs – The Sundowners (Sea Note, 1993)
An Arrow Through the Bitch – Palace Brothers (Domino, 1994)
Hope – Palace Songs (1994)
The Mountain – Palace (Drag City, 1995)
Songs Put Together For (The Broken Giant) – Palace Soundtrack (Drag City, 1996)
Western Music – Will Oldham (Ovni, 1997)
Black/Rich Music – Will Oldham (Drag City, 1998) (re-release of Songs Put Together (for the Broken Giant))
Blue Lotus Feet – Bonnie 'Prince' Billy (Domino, 1998)
Dream of a Drunk Black Southern Eagle – Bonnie 'Prince' Billy (Domino, 1999)
More Revery (live version) – Bonny Billy (Travels in Constants Vol 7, 2000)
Ode Music – Will Oldham (Drag City, 2000)
All Most Heaven – Will Oldham and Rian Murphy (Drag City, 2000)
Get on Jolly – Bonnie Billy and the Marquis de Tren (Drag City, 2000)
More Revery (studio version) – Bonny Billy (Temporary Residence, 2001)
Amalgamated Sons of Rest – Amalgamated Sons of Rest (Galaxia, 2002)
Slitch Music – The Continental OP (Drag City, 2002)
Seafarers Music – Will Oldham (Drag City, 2004)
Pebbles and Ripples – Bonny Billy and Brightblack (Galaxia, 2004) / (Split EP)
I Gave You – Bonny/Sweeney (Drag City, 2005)
Strange Form of Life – Bonnie 'Prince' Billy (Drag City, 2007)
Ask Forgiveness – Bonnie 'Prince' Billy with Meg Baird & Greg Weeks (Drag City, November 19, 2007)
Chijimi EP – Bonnie 'Prince' Billy (Drag City/ Palace Records, 2009) / (Tour-Only 10-inch)
Among The Gold – Bonnie 'Prince' Billy & Cheyenne Marie Mize (May 19, 2009)
The Mindeater – Bonnie 'Prince' Billy & The Phantom Family Halo (10-inch EP) / (September 2011)
Bonnie & Mariee EP – Bonnie 'Prince' Billy & Mariee Sioux (Spiritual Pajamas, Feb. 2012)
The Duchess – Trembling Bells & Bonnie 'Prince' Billy (Honest Jon's Records, April 2012)
Hummingbird EP – Bonnie 'Prince' Billy (Spiritual Pajamas, May 2012)
Now Here's My Plan – Bonnie 'Prince' Billy (Domino, July 2012)
Solemns – Bonnie 'Prince' Billy & Marquis de Tren (Drag City, 2013)
Barely Regal - Bonnie 'Prince' Billy (Drag City, 2014)
Tip The Glass & Feel The Bottom – Bonnie 'Prince' Billy & The Cairo Gang (Future Oak Record Co., 2015) / (10-inch EP)
The Happy Song / At The Corner Of The Stairs – Bonnie 'Prince' Billy & Oscar Parsons (Split EP) (Palace Records PR502)
Wallins Creek Girls – Bonnie 'Prince' Billy & Nathan Salsburg (Record Store Day 2017) (Paradise of Bachelors 2017)
The Best Of Folks/Harbour Men, 7″ – Bonnie Prince Billy/Naked Shortsellers (Split EP)

Singles

Compilation appearances 
This section lists Will Oldham songs which have appeared exclusively on multi-artist compilations.
"For The Mekons, et al." – Palace Brothers (Hey Drag City – Drag City, 1993)
"Don't I Look Good Today" – Palace Brothers (Louisville Sluggers Vol.3 – Self-Destruct, 1993)
"Two More Days" – Palace Brothers (Love Is My Only Crime 2 – Veracity/Intercord, 1994)
"I Am A Cinematographer (Live)" – Palace Brothers (The Drag City Hour – Sea Note, 1996)
"Meaulnes (Live)" – Palace Brothers (The Drag City Hour – Sea Note, 1996)
"I Send My Love To You (Live)" – Palace Brothers (The Drag City Hour – Sea Note, 1996)
"You Will Miss Me When I Burn (Live)" – Palace Brothers (The Drag City Hour – Sea Note, 1996)
"Little Blue Eyes" (studio version) – Palace (Sourmash: A Louisville Compilation – X-Static/Boss Snake Music, 1996)
"Ebb's Folly" – Will Oldham and Jim O'Rourke (Dutch Harbor OST – Atavistic, 1997)
"Blokbuster (Live)" – Live Palace Music (Felidae – Last Exit, 1997)
"What's Wrong With A Zoo?" – Bonnie 'Prince' Billy (Quelque Chose d'Organique OST – Virgin France, 1998)
"Watch With Me" – Bonnie 'Prince' Billy (Methods of Intimate Plumbing – Blue Bunny Records, 1999)
"Song For The New Breed (acoustic)" – Bonnie 'Prince' Billy (Louisvillesonicimprint-Vol. 1 – Ghetto Defendant, 2000)
"Today I Started Celebrating Again" – Bonnie 'Prince' Billy (At Home With The Groovebox – Grand Royal, 2000)
"The Eagle and the Hawk" (John Denver) – Bonnie 'Prince' Billy (Take Me Home – Badman Recording Co., 2000)
"Early Morning Melody" – Bonnie 'Prince' Billy (Shellac presents All Tomorrow's Parties 2.0 – BMI, 2002)
"You Can Never Go Fast Enough" – Will Oldham and Alan Licht (Don't Cry, Driver – Plain Recordings, 2003)
"There's Something About What Happens When We Talk" – Bonnie Billy and Mary Feiock (Louisville is for Lovers Vol. 3 – Double Malt, 2003)
"All These Vicious Dogs" – Will Oldham (All The Real Girls OST – Sanctuary Records/Combustion Music, 2003)
"Lessons From What's Poor (different version)" – Bonnie 'Prince' Billy (Now Who's Crazy? – Drag City, 2003)
"Antagonism (live)" – Bonnie 'Prince' Billy (Wide-Awake Crescent-Shaped – CWAS smile, 2004)
"Demon Lover" – Superwolf (Sprout OST – Brushfire Records, 2005)
"My Home is the Sea (live)" – Bonnie 'Prince' Billy and Matt Sweeney (Drag City A–Z – Drag City, 2005)
"Will Oldham Speaks His Peace" – Will Oldham (Sea Note presents Mr. Jews 7-inch – Sea Note, 2005)
"Song For Doctors Without Borders" – Bonnie 'Prince' Billy (Not Alone – Durtro Jnana, 2006)
"Monolith Lamb" – Bonnie Billy & Oscar Parsons (Spacemoth 5th Anniversary Compilation 2 – Spacemoth CDr, 2006)
"Love Is Pleasing" – Bonnie 'Prince' Billy (Louisville Is For Lovers 6 – Double Malt, 2006)
"Wouldn't It Be Nice" (The Beach Boys) – Oldham Brothers (Do It Again: a Tribute to Pet Sounds – Houston Party Record, 2006)
"Puff the Magic Dragon" – Bonnie 'Prince' Billy (Songs for the Young at Heart – V2 Records, 2/2007)
"Get Your Hands Dirty" – Bonnie 'Prince' Billy (Louisville is for Lovers Vol. 8 – Double Malt, 2008)
"Torn And Brayed" – Bonnie 'Prince' Billy and Matt Sweeney (Palermo Shooting OST, 2008)
 "The Girl in Me" – Bonnie 'Prince' Billy (Louisville is for Lovers Vol. 9 – Double Malt, 2009)
 "New Wedding" – Bonnie 'Prince' Billy (The Present OST – Brushfire, 2009)
 "My Only Friend" (Chris Knox) – Bonnie 'Prince' Billy (Stroke – Songs For Chris Knox – Merge, 2009)
 "Love in the Hot Afternoon" (Gene Watson) – Bonnie 'Prince' Billy & Matt Sweeney (The Adult Swim Singles Program – Adult Swim, 2010)
 "Hombre Sencillo (Simple Man)" (Graham Nash) – Bonnie 'Prince' Billy (Be Yourself: A Tribute to Graham Nash's Songs For Beginners – Grassroots, 2010)
 "All The Trees Of The Field Will Clap Their Hands" (Sufjan Stevens) – Bonnie 'Prince' Billy (Seven Swans Reimagined – On Joyful Wings, 2011)
 "Storms" (Fleetwood Mac) – Bonnie 'Prince' Billy & Matt Sweeney (Just Tell Me That You Want Me: A Tribute to Fleetwood Mac – Hear Music, 2012)
 "Gypsy He-Witch" (Jason Molina) – Bonnie 'Prince' Billy (Weary Engine Blues: A Tribute To Jason Molina – Graveface, 2013)
 "Where's the Playground Susie" (Jimmy Webb) – Bonnie 'Prince' Billy ("Still on the Line: A Tribute to Jimmy Webb" – Flannelgraph, 2015)

Collaborations

Albums 
Fearful Symmetry – Box of Chocolates (Mad Entropic Carnaval, 1990)
The Last Place to Go – Boxhead Ensemble (Atavistic, 1998)
Songs From Robert Louis Stevenson's 'A Child's Garden Of Verses''' – The Anomoanon (Palace Records, 2000)Greetings from Providence, R.I. – Havanarama (Self-released, 2000)Whatever, Mortal – Papa M (Drag City, 2001)Tranquil Isolation – Nicolai Dunger (Virgin, 2002)Rock The Blockade – Havanarama (Secret Eye, 2003)Ala.Cali.Tucky – BrightBlack (Galaxia, 2004)No Earthly Man – Alasdair Roberts (Drag City, 2005)Safe Inside the Day – Baby Dee (Drag City, 2008)Is It The Sea? – Bonnie 'Prince' Billy with Harem Scarem & Alex Neilson (Domino, 2008)Silent City – Brian Harnetty & Bonnie 'Prince' Billy (Atavistic, 2009)Hello Sorrow, Hello Joy – Three Queens in Mourning / Bonnie 'Prince' Billy (Textile Records, 2020)

 EPs Summer Never Ends – The Anomoanon (Palace Records, 1999)Fish & Crabs – Havanarama (Self-released, 1999)Mutter – Carrie Yury (Self-released, 2005)

 Songs 

 Tributes 
Johnny Cash recorded a version of "I See a Darkness" on his American Recordings disc American III: Solitary Man (2000). Oldham provided backing vocals.
Half Man Half Biscuit mention both the Palace Brothers and Bonnie 'Prince' Billy in the song "Emerging From Gorse" on their Trouble Over Bridgwater album (2000).
"Harm of Will" from Björk's Vespertine album (2001) is about, and named after, Will Oldham.
Oldham was the subject of a 2004 30-track double-CD tribute album (and a smaller 18-track version) released on Tract Records, titled I Am a Cold Rock. I Am Dull Grass., The album features performances by Calexico, Jolie Holland, Sodastream, and Iron & Wine, among others.
Jeffrey Lewis's album City and Eastern Songs (2005) included the track "Williamsburg Will Oldham Horror."
Steve Adey also covered "I See a Darkness" on his LP All Things Real (2006).
Scottish rock group Biffy Clyro mentioned Oldham in their song "Saturday Superhouse" from their album Puzzle (2007).
Mark Kozelek recorded a version of Oldham's "New Partner" on his 2008 disc, The Finally LP.
In 2009 Mark Lanegan and Soulsavers recorded a cover version of "You Will Miss Me When I Burn." The release is a split single, backed with the Lanegan-penned "Sunrise" featuring vocals by Oldham.
In 2017, the Spanish superstar Rosalía (singer) made a flamenco cover of "I See a Darkness" in her album Los ángeles (album)''.

References

External links 
The Royal Stable – an extensive Will Oldham discography.

Country music discographies
Folk music discographies
Discographies of American artists
Discography